Raymond S. Bradley is a climatologist and University Distinguished Professor in the Department of Geosciences at the University of Massachusetts Amherst, where he is also research director of the Climate System Research Center. Bradley's work indicates that the warming of Earth's climate system in the twentieth century is inexplicable via natural mechanisms.

Biography
Ray Bradley is a Distinguished Professor in the Department of Geosciences and Director of the Climate System Research Center at the University of Massachusetts, Amherst. He did his undergraduate work at Southampton University (U.K.) and his post-graduate studies (M.S., Ph.D.) at the Institute of Arctic and Alpine Research, University of Colorado, Boulder.  He also earned a D.Sc. from Southampton University, for his contributions in paleoclimatology.  In 2015, he received the Zuckerberg Leadership Chair from the University of Massachusetts Foundation, and he was a Visiting Professor at the University of Bergen, Norway.

Bradley received the Oeschger Medal of the European Geosciences Union and honorary degrees (D.Sc honoris causa) from Lancaster University (U.K.), Queen's University (Canada) and the University of Bern (Switzerland).  He is a Fellow of the Royal Society of Canada, the American Geophysical Union, the American Association for the Advancement of Science and the Arctic Institute of North America.  He was also elected as a Foreign Member of the Finnish Academy of Science and Letters, and Academia Europaea, the European Academy of Science.

Bradley's research focuses on climate variability over recent centuries and millennia, using instrumental and proxy records of past climate, making major contributions to our understanding of climate change over the last century. He has made it clear that these changes are well outside the envelope of natural variability that the earth has experienced over recent millennia.  His research on natural forcing factors has helped to clarify the factors that caused climates to vary in the past.  He has shown the critical importance of well-calibrated paleoclimate proxies for placing recent changes in a long-term context, thereby clarifying the important effects that humans have had on climate in recent decades.  This led to him becoming the target of political attacks by global warming deniers, to which he has responded, in terms that provide a clear explanation of the issues involved for the public at large, in "Global Warming and Political Intimidation", 2011, University of Massachusetts Press, Amherst, also available in a Japanese translation [2012] by Kagaku Dojin, Tokyo.

Other books include, "The Hadley Circulation, Present, Past and Future" (eds. H.F. Diaz, and R.S. Bradley, 2004. Kluwer Academic, Dordrecht); "Paleoclimate, Global Change and the Future" (eds. K. Alverson, R.S. Bradley and T.F. Pedersen, 2003; Springer, Berlin); "Climate Change and Society" (R.S. Bradley and N.E. Law, 2001, Stanley Thornes, Cheltenham, U.K.); "Climate Variations and Forcing Mechanisms of the Last 2000 years" (eds. P.D. Jones, R.S. Bradley and J. Jouzel, 1996. Springer, Berlin), and "Climate Since A.D. 1500" (eds. R.S. Bradley and P.D. Jones, 1995. Routledge, London). In addition, Bradley has authored/co-authored more than 200 peer-reviewed articles on climate change, covering a wide range of topics. He has a particular focus on the climate of the Arctic, and of mountainous areas, reflecting his long-standing interests in those regions. He has carried out extensive fieldwork in the Arctic and North Atlantic region (Canadian High Arctic, Greenland, Svalbard, the Faroe Islands and northern Norway). Bradley's research has been supported primarily by the National Science Foundation, the Department of Energy, NOAA and the National Geographic Society.

Bradley was a contributing author to the IPCC TAR , and worked on reconstructing the temperature record of the past 1000 years with Michael E. Mann and Malcolm K. Hughes, a dendroclimatologist. This work received a disproportionate amount of attention after figuring prominently in the IPCC TAR SPM. In 2005, the Chair of the US House of Representatives Committee on Energy and Commerce, Rep. Joe Barton (R-Texas) demanded that Bradley provide a detailed accounting of the data and funding of his research on climate change.  Bradley recommends a commentary by Gavin Schmidt on the RealClimate website as providing a very good guide to the issues.

Ray Bradley has been an advisor to various government and international agencies, including the U.S., Swiss, Swedish, Finnish, German and U.K. National Science Foundations, the U.S. National Oceanic and Atmospheric Administration (NOAA), the National Research Council, the Inter-Governmental Panel on Climate Change (IPCC), the US-Russia Working Group on Environmental Protection, and the International Geosphere-Biosphere Program (IGBP).  He has given many TV and radio interviews, and is a speaker on climate change and global warming, and global environmental changes.  He has given talks at venues in China, Japan, Dubai, England, Switzerland, France, Germany, Spain, Sweden, Norway, Finland, Canada, Chile, Argentina and the United States.

Interests and activities

Bradley's research interests are in climatology and paleoclimatology, with a particular focus on how climate has changed since the last ice age. He has worked in the Arctic—Ellesmere and Cornwallis Island in the Canadian High Arctic, southern and southeastern Greenland, the Faroe Islands, northwestern Norway and Svalbard. He has given lectures on climate change, global warming and climate impacts to a wide range of audiences at various venues around the world, and is often available for public speaking engagements.

References

External links 
 "" Ray Bradley's home page
 "". Department of Geosciences, University of Massachusetts Amherst.
 "Publications of Raymond S. Bradley"
 Climate System Research Center

Date of birth missing (living people)
American climatologists
Intergovernmental Panel on Climate Change contributing authors
University of Massachusetts Amherst faculty
Living people
Environmental bloggers
Science bloggers
Year of birth missing (living people)